Sharan Newman (born April 15, 1949, in Ann Arbor, Michigan) is an American historian and writer of historical novels. She won the Macavity Award for Best First Mystery in 1994.

Biography
Newman's father was a USAF captain; her mother was a psychologist. In 1971 she both graduated from Antioch College and married Paul Richard Newman, a physicist. She also gained a master's in medieval literature in 1973 from Michigan State University and then doctoral work in Medieval studies at the University of California at Santa Barbara. Newman lectures widely in medieval history and currently lives in Ireland.

Writing
Newman's first novels were a historical trilogy about Guinevere. Then she turned to mystery novels set in 12th-century France featuring Catherine LeVendeur, a novice in a convent run by Heloise – though she later leaves and marries.

Awards
Newman's debut mystery, Death Comes as Epiphany, won the Macavity Award for "Best First Novel" in 1994 and was also nominated for the 1994 Anthony Award and the 1993 Agatha Award in the same category. The novel was also nominated for the 1994 Dilys Award for the mystery title of the year which the Independent Mystery Booksellers Association booksellers have most enjoyed selling. The Wandering Arm and Strong As Death also received nominations for Agatha Awards for "Best Novel" in 1995 and 1996 respectively.

Bibliography

Guinevere series
 Guinevere (1981)  
 The Chessboard Queen (1983) 
 Guinevere Evermore (1985)

Catherine LeVendeur series
 Death Comes as Epiphany (1993) Macavity Award
 The Devil's Door (1994) 
 The Wandering Arm (1995) 
 Strong as Death (1996) 
 Cursed in the Blood (1998) Herodotus Award for "Best US Historical Mystery"
 The Difficult Saint (1999) 
 To Wear the White Cloak (2000) 
 Heresy (2002) 
 The Outcast Dove (2003) 
 The Witch in the Well (2004)

Other novels 

 The Dagda's Harp (1976)
 The Shanghai Tunnel (2008)

Anthologies and collections 

 Death Before Compline (2011)
Home from America (Aug 2010) in Death's Excellent Vacation

Anthologies edited
 Crime Through Time (1997) (with Miriam Grace Monfredo) 
 Crime Through Time II (1998) (with Miriam Grace Monfredo) 
 Crime Through Time III (2000) (intro. Anne Perry)

Non-fiction
 The Real History Behind the Da Vinci Code (2005) 
 The Real History Behind the Templars (2007) 
 The Real History of the End of the World (2010) 
 Defending the City of God (2014)

References

External links

1949 births
Living people
20th-century American novelists
21st-century American novelists
21st-century American historians
American historical novelists
American mystery writers
American women novelists
Antioch College alumni
Macavity Award winners
Michigan State University alumni
Writers from Ann Arbor, Michigan
University of California, Santa Barbara alumni
Novelists from Oregon
Writers of historical fiction set in the Middle Ages
American women historians
Women mystery writers
20th-century American women writers
21st-century American women writers
Women historical novelists
Novelists from Michigan
20th-century American non-fiction writers
21st-century American non-fiction writers
Historians from Michigan